Freedom of the Seas may refer to:

Freedom of the seas, a legal concept 
Mare Liberum (The Free Sea or The Freedom of the Sea), a book in Latin on international law written by Hugo Grotius
 The Freedom of the Seas (play), 1918 play by Walter C. Hackett
Freedom of the Seas (film), a 1934 film based on the play directed by Marcel Varnel
MS Freedom of the Seas, a cruise ship